Lophopetalum wightianum is a species of plant in the family Celastraceae. It is found in Brunei, Cambodia, India, Indonesia, Laos, Malaysia, Myanmar, Pakistan, Singapore, Thailand, and Vietnam.

References

wrightianum
Least concern plants
Taxonomy articles created by Polbot